Nimrata (Gurmukhi: ਨਿਮਰਤਾ nimaratā) is an important virtue that is vigorously promoted by Gurbani and Sikh history. The literal translation of this Punjabi word is "Humility", or "Benevolence". The other four qualities in the arsenal are: Truth (Sat), Contentment (Santokh), Compassion (Daya) and Love (Pyaar). 

Sikh terminology